The following is a list of coaches, including position, year(s) of service(s), who appeared at least in one game for the Los Angeles Dodgers National League franchise also known previously as the Brooklyn Dodgers.

Bench coach 

Monty Basgall (1980)
Joe Ferguson (1988–1989)
Bill Russell (1990)
Joe Ferguson (1991)
Ben Hines (1992)
Joe Ferguson (1993–1994)
Bill Russell (1996)
Manny Mota (1996)
Mike Scioscia (1997–1998)
Jim Tracy (1999–2000)
Jim Riggleman (2001–2005)
Jim Lett (2005)
Dave Jauss (2006–2007)
Bob Schaefer (2008–2010)
Trey Hillman (2011–2013)
Tim Wallach (2014–2015)
Bob Geren (2016–2022)
Danny Lehmann (2023–present)

Hitting coach 
Dixie Walker (1970–1974)
Jim Gilliam (1977–1978)
Jim Lefebvre (1978–1979)
Manny Mota (1980–1989)
Ben Hines (1987–1993)
Reggie Smith (1994–1999)
Rick Down (1999–2000)
Jack Clark (2001–2003)
George Hendrick (2003)
Tim Wallach (2004–2005)
Eddie Murray (2006–2007)
Bill Mueller (2007)
Mike Easler (2008)
Don Mattingly (2008–2010)
Jeff Pentland (2011)
Dave Hansen (2011–2012)
Mark McGwire (2013–2015)
Turner Ward (2016–2018)
Robert Van Scoyoc (2019–present)
Brant Brown (2021-2022)
Aaron Bates (2023–present)

Pitching coach 

Ted Lyons (1954)
Joe Becker (1955–1964)
Lefty Phillips (1965–1968)
Red Adams (1969–1980)
Ron Perranoski (1981–1994)
Dave Wallace (1995–1997)
Glenn Gregson (1998)
Charlie Hough (1998–1999)
Claude Osteen (1999–2000)
Dave Wallace (2000)
Jim Colborn (2001–2005)
Rick Honeycutt (2006–2019)
Mark Prior (2020–present)

First base coach 

Jimmy Johnston (1931)
Freddie Fitzsimmons (1940)
Van Lingle Mungo (1940)
Red Corriden (1941–1946)
Jake Pitler (1947–1957)
Greg Mulleavy (1958–1960, 1962–1964)
Jim Gilliam (1965–1973)
Monty Basgall (1977–1979)
Jim Lefebvre (1978–1979)
Manny Mota (1980)
Monty Basgall (1981–1986)
Joe Ferguson (1990, 1992)
Ben Hines (1993)
Reggie Smith (1994–1998)
John Shelby (1998–2005)
Mariano Duncan (2006–2010)
Davey Lopes (2011–2015)
George Lombard (2016–2020)
Clayton McCullough (2021–present)

Third base coach 
Danny Ozark (1965-1972)
Preston Gómez (1977–1979)
Danny Ozark (1980-1982)
Joey Amalfitano (1983–1998)
Glenn Hoffman (1999–2005)
Rich Donnelly (2006–2007)
Larry Bowa (2008–2010)
Tim Wallach (2011–2013)
Lorenzo Bundy (2014–2015)
Ron Roenicke (2015)
Chris Woodward (2016–2018)
Dino Ebel (2019–present)

Bullpen coach 
Carroll Beringer (1967–1972)
Mark Cresse (1974–1998)
Glenn Hoffman (1999)
Rick Dempsey (1999–2000)
Jim Lett (2001–2004)
Dan Warthen (2006–2007)
Ken Howell (2008–2012)
Chuck Crim (2013–2015)
Josh Bard (2016–2017)
Mark Prior (2018–2019)
Josh Bard (2020-present)

Assistant hitting coach
Jeff Pentland (2009–2010)
Dave Hansen (2011)
John Valentin (2013–2015)
Tim Hyers (2016–2017)
Brant Brown (2018)
Luis Ortiz (2018)
Aaron Bates (2019–2022)

Assistant pitching coach
Ken Howell (2013–2015)
Connor McGuiness (2020-present)

Bullpen catcher

Travis Barbary (1998–2001)
Rob Flippo (2002–2017)
Mike Borzello (2007–2011)
Fumi Ishibashi (2013, 2018)
Steve Cilladi (2014–present)

Other assistant coaches
Monty Basgall (1973–1976)
Ray Blades (1947–1948)
Bobby Bragan (1960)
Brant Brown (hitting strategist, 2019–2020)
Clay Bryant (1961)
Lorenzo Bundy (outfield coach, 2015)
Juan Castro (quality assurance coach 2016–2017)
Charlie Dressen (1939–1942, 1945–1946, 1958–1959)
Leo Durocher (1961–1964)
Ben Egan (1925)
Freddie Fitzsimmons (1942)
Bob Geren (Major League field coordinator, 2023–present) 
Chris Gimenez (Game Planning, 2019)
Preston Gómez (1965–1968)
Jesse Haines (1938)
Roy Hartsfield (1969–1972)
Ray Hayworth (1945)
Andy High (1937–1938)
Joe Kelley (1926)
Bill Killefer (1939)
Tommy Lasorda (1973–1976)
Cookie Lavagetto (1951–1953)
Danny Lehman (2018, 2020-2022, game planning and communication coach)
Joe McGinnity (1926)
Otto Miller (1926–1936)
Manny Mota (1990-2013)
Ivy Olson (1924, 1930–1931)
Danny Ozark (1965–1972, 1980–1982)
Pee Wee Reese (1959)
Pete Reiser (1960–1964)
Ron Roenicke (1992–1993)
Bill Russell (1987–1989, 1991)
Babe Ruth (1938)
Casey Stengel (1932–1933, 1949–1950)
Zack Taylor (1935)
Ben Tincup (1940)
Rube Walker (1958)
Steve Yeager (catching instructor, 2012–2018)

References

External links
Dodgers coaching history

Coaches
 
 
Los Angeles Dodgers